Sal Pace (born December 14, 1976) is an American politician and marijuana advocate who served as a member of the Colorado House of Representatives, where he represented House District 46, which includes western Pueblo, Colorado from 2008 to 2012. During his time at the state house, Pace served as the Colorado House minority leader. In 2012, he ran against incumbent congressman Republican Scott Tipton in Colorado's 3rd Congressional District, although Tipton was ultimately re-elected. He then served as a County Commissioner of Pueblo County, Colorado until 2019.

Early life and education
Pace, the youngest of nine children, moved to Colorado when he was 18. He attended Fort Lewis College, where he majored in political science and was appointed by the State Board of Agriculture to serve on a search committee for a Fort Lewis College president. He then attended Louisiana State University, earning a master's degree in American political theory.

Career 
Pace taught American government at Pueblo Community College and Colorado State University–Pueblo.

Pace served as a legislative aide to John Salazar in the Colorado House of Representatives, where he worked on water and health care legislation. When Salazar was elected to the U.S. House of Representatives, Pace continued to work for him as a District Director, Congressional staffer, and as the manager of Salazar's 2006 re-election campaign.

Pace was elected to the Colorado House of Representatives in 2008, and served until 2012. During his time in the house, Pace advocated for statewide marijuana legalization. In 2012, recreational marijuana use was legalized through Colorado Amendment 64. Pace has drafted and sponsored several bills related to marijuana policy, and has been credited with transforming Pueblo County, Colorado into the "Napa Valley of cannabis." Since leaving the State House, Pace continued to specialize in marijuana policy on the county level. Pace serves on the national board of the Marijuana Policy Project, which advocates for liberalizing marijuana laws within states. He also sits on the national advisory board at HeadCount's Cannabis Voter Project. In Colorado, Pace is a Governor-appointed board member on the Institute of Cannabis Research.

After the 2018 Colorado gubernatorial election, Pace was selected to serve as a co-chair on Governor-elect Jared Polis' transition team.

Pace currently consults in government affairs and cannabis policy.

2012 Congressional election

Pace's race was touted as a primary example by Time Magazine of the role that so-called SuperPacs can play in winning an election. Having gotten close in the polls near October 1, the GOP money machine targeted the seat. Without Democrats matching, Pace ultimately lost.

In the 2012 General Election, Pace faced Republican Congressman Scott Tipton. Tipton won by a margin of 53% to 41%, with the remainder of the vote going to third-party candidates.

Pueblo County Commission
From 2013 until 2019, Pace served as a County Commissioner of Pueblo County, Colorado. As one of three commissioners, each elected county-wide, he represented the 165,000 residents of Pueblo County.

Pace has been an advocate for passenger rail in Colorado; and chaired the Southwest Chief Passenger Rail Commission while serving as a County Commissioner. In 2016 Pace received the highest national recognition from Amtrak, the President's Safety and Service Award.

Personal life 
Pace is divorced and has three children.

References

External links
Legislative profile at the Colorado General Assembly
Sal Pace for U.S. Congress campaign website

Campaign contributions at OpenSecrets.org

Democratic Party members of the Colorado House of Representatives
Living people
1975 births
County commissioners in Colorado
People from New London, Connecticut
People from Pueblo County, Colorado
Fort Lewis College alumni
Louisiana State University alumni